The Sky of Mind is Ray Lynch's second album released in 1983. Initially released on a cassette tape, the album was promoted by word of mouth, and became an underground success.

Production
The album was recorded and produced at Lynch's own home. The album was dedicated to his spiritual teacher, Adi Da Samraj. On the label is a quote from Adi Da's 1978 work, The Enlightenment of the Whole Body, starting with "The mind is like a cave of bats." The titles "Quandra", "Too Wounded", and "Green Is Here" were also taken from works by Adi Da. The album was rearranged for its subsequent re-releases.

Reception

Stephen David of New Age Journal described the album as a "suite of meditations", stating that it was "quiet, ethereal, and a little predictable". AllMusic gave the re-release a 3/5, writing "the radiant compositions also make for ideal morning listening". In the appendix of their 1988 book, Healing Music, Andrew Watson and Nevill Drury writes that the album is "a modern interpretation of classical themes", noting the combination of acoustic and synthesized instruments. They also wrote that one of the tracks, "The Temple", "could easily be inspired by Ligeti".

Track listing

Personnel
 Ray Lynch – synthesizers, piano and guitar
 Van Thanh Nguyen – tibetan bells
 Beverly Jacobs – flute
 Eric Leber – recorders
 Adam Trombly – tambura
 Julie Feldman – cello
 Rick Concoff – violin
 Ginny Leber, Sylvia Hayden, Antonina Randazzo – vocal effects

Production
 Stephen Hart and Ray Lynch – engineering and mixing

References

1983 albums
Ray Lynch albums
Music West Records albums
Windham Hill Records albums